The Third Republic of the Dominican Republic covers from 12 July 1924 with the departure of American troops after the end of the first American occupation, until 28 April 1965 with the disembarkation of American troops after the start of the April 1965 War and the second American occupation. This period is also known as the Age of Trujillo, because of the strong influence exerted by the Trujillo regime over much of these 41 years.

See also
 History of the Dominican Republic
 First Dominican Republic
 Second Dominican Republic

References

History of the Dominican Republic
1924 in the Dominican Republic
Government of the Dominican Republic
Politics of the Dominican Republic